Lignosus cameronensis is a species of poroid fungus in the family Polyporaceae. The pores on the cap underside are tiny, numbering 2–4 per millimetre.

Described as a new species in 2013, it is found in the tropical forests of Pahang, Malaysia. The specific epithet cameronensis refers to the type locality, the Cameron Highlands. The fungus fruit bodies are similar in appearance to those of Lignosus ekombitii, but differs in having smaller spores that typically measure 2.4–4.8 by 1.9–3.2 μm.

References

Polyporaceae
Fungi described in 2013
Fungi of Asia